Interim Climate Data Record
International Centre for Dispute Resolution
Ivanhoé Chevalier Du Roi

See also
ICDr.